Daniela Eugenia Velasco Maldonado (born August 24, 1995) is a Mexican Paralympic athlete who was part of the Mexican delegation at the 2016 Summer Paralympics. She was a bronze medalist in the 400 meters dash of the T12 category at the 2012 Summer Paralympics. She was close to being a medalist in the 1500 meters of Rio 2016 but was then disqualified.

Life 
As a child she suffered the loss of an eye and rehabilitated at the National Institute for Rehabilitation of Blind and Visually Impaired Children of Mexico. 
Her start in athletics was motivated by Ana Gabriela Guevara, whom she watched competing in the 2004 Summer Olympics, so she looked for opportunities to practice adaptive sports in the Mexican Paralympic Center. 

She is a student of the National Preparatory School of the National Autonomous University of Mexico. Her coach is Fabricio Chamor and her guide is Gabriel Urbina.

Sports career 
Velasco won two bronze medals and one silver medal at the 2011 Parapan American Games, in the 100, 200 and 400-meters dash, respectively. 
At the 2012 Summer Paralympics, she competed in the 400 meters dash in the T12 category, with her guide Jose Fuentes, obtaining the bronze medal with a time of 58.51. 
In the 2015 Parapan American Games, she achieved the gold medal in the 800 meters T12 category with a 2:16.89 run time, which represented an American record.

References 

1995 births
Living people
Athletes from Mexico City
Paralympic athletes of Mexico
Mexican female sprinters
Athletes (track and field) at the 2012 Summer Paralympics
Athletes (track and field) at the 2016 Summer Paralympics
Paralympic bronze medalists for Mexico
Medalists at the 2012 Summer Paralympics
Paralympic medalists in athletics (track and field)
Medalists at the 2011 Parapan American Games
Medalists at the 2015 Parapan American Games